The rusty-margined flycatcher (Myiozetetes cayanensis) is a species of bird in the family Tyrannidae, the tyrant flycatchers.

It is found in northern and central South America in Bolivia, Brazil, Colombia, Ecuador, French Guiana, Guyana, Peru, Suriname, and Venezuela; also eastern Panama. Its natural habitats are subtropical or tropical moist lowland forests and heavily degraded former forest.

Taxonomy

In 1760 the French zoologist Mathurin Jacques Brisson included a description of the rusty-margined flycatcher in his Ornithologie based on a specimen collected in Cayenne in French Guiana. He used the French name Le gobe-mouche de Cayenne and the Latin Muscicapa Cayanensis. Although Brisson coined Latin names, these do not conform to the binomial system and are not recognised by the International Commission on Zoological Nomenclature. When in 1766 the Swedish naturalist Carl Linnaeus updated his Systema Naturae for the twelfth edition, he added 240 species that had been previously described by Brisson. One of these was the rusty-margined flycatcher. Linnaeus included a brief description, used Brisson's Latin name as the binomial name Muscicapa cayanensis and cited Brisson's work. This species is now placed in the genus Myiozetetes that was introduced by the English zoologist Philip Sclater in 1859 . Four subspecies are recognised.

References

Further reading

External links
Rusty-margined flycatcher videos on the Internet Bird Collection
Rusty-margined flycatcher photo gallery VIREO
Photo-High Res--(Close-up); Article pbase–"Panama Birding"

rusty-margined flycatcher
Birds of the Amazon Basin
Birds of Bolivia
Birds of Brazil
Birds of the Cerrado
Birds of Colombia
Birds of Venezuela
Birds of the Guianas
Birds of Panama
Birds of the Tumbes-Chocó-Magdalena
rusty-margined flycatcher
rusty-margined flycatcher
Taxonomy articles created by Polbot